Kim Ji-hyun (born 10 September 1974), also known as Jihyun Marr, is a former South Korean badminton player. She participated at the 1996 and 2000 Summer Olympics in the women's singles event. Kim who affiliated with the Samsung Electro-Mechanics team, won the women's singles title at the National Championships tournament in 1997 and 1998. She announced her retirement from the international tournament after the 2001 Korea Open.

She was a former coach at the BWF training academy in Saarbrucken, later joined the New Zealand, Korean, and Indian national team. Earlier in 2019, she helped India get its first gold in BWF World Championships in Basel where P. V. Sindhu became India's first badminton player to become World Champion. She worked as a coach for Indian national team until September 2019 when she resigned to take care of her ailing husband. In november 2020 she was appointed as one of the five new coaches by the Badminton Korea Association (BKA) responsible for the women's singles till 31 October 2022.

Achievements

Asian Championships 
Women's singles

Asian Cup 
Women's singles

East Asian Games 
Women's singles

World Junior Championships 
The Bimantara World Junior Championships was an international invitation badminton tournament for junior players. It was held in Jakarta, Indonesia from 1987 to 1991.

Girls' singles

IBF World Grand Prix 
The World Badminton Grand Prix was sanctioned by the International Badminton Federation from 1983 to 2006.

Women's singles

IBF International 
Women's singles

Women's doubles

References

External links 
 
 

1974 births
Living people
Sportspeople from Busan
South Korean female badminton players
Badminton players at the 1996 Summer Olympics
Badminton players at the 2000 Summer Olympics
Olympic badminton players of South Korea
Badminton players at the 1994 Asian Games
Badminton players at the 1998 Asian Games
Asian Games gold medalists for South Korea
Asian Games silver medalists for South Korea
Asian Games medalists in badminton
Medalists at the 1994 Asian Games
Medalists at the 1998 Asian Games
Badminton coaches
21st-century South Korean women
20th-century South Korean women
South Korean expatriate sportspeople in Germany
South Korean expatriate sportspeople in New Zealand
South Korean expatriate sportspeople in India